Chapel Branch is a  long tributary to Lewes Creek in Sussex County, Delaware.  Lewes Creek then flows into the Nanticoke River.

See also
List of Delaware rivers

References

Rivers of Delaware
Rivers of Sussex County, Delaware
Tributaries of the Nanticoke River